Edgwick is a residential area of Coventry, West Midlands, England.

It is situated approximately 2 miles north of the city centre, between the districts of Great Heath and Foleshill.

The area is variously spelt as Edgewick or Edgwick.

Suburbs of Coventry